The Jamaican Ambassador in Beijing is the representative of the government in Kingston (Jamaica), the government of the People's Republic of China. The Jamaican Ambassador is also commissioned as high commissioner (Commonwealth).

The Jamaican Ambassador is concurrently non-resident ambassador in Hanoi (Vietnam) and Vientiane (Laos), Dhaka (Bangladesh), Singapore and Islamabad (Pakistan).

List of representatives

See also 
China–Jamaica relations

References 

 
China
Jamaica